There are over 20,000 Grade II* listed buildings in England. This page is a list of these buildings in the district of South Staffordshire in Staffordshire.

South Staffordshire

|}

See also
 Grade I listed buildings in Staffordshire

Notes

External links

 
Lists of Grade II* listed buildings in Staffordshire